Miss You is the fifth extended play (EP) by English singer-songwriter Gabrielle Aplin. It was released on 16 December 2016 through Aplin's record label, Never Fade Records. The EP was supported by the lead single and title track, "Miss You", released on 9 November 2016.

Track listing

References

2016 EPs
Gabrielle Aplin albums